A Night in the Show was Charlie Chaplin's 12th film for Essanay. It was made at Majestic Studio in Los Angeles in the fall of 1915. Chaplin played two roles: one as Mr. Pest and one as Mr. Rowdy. The film was created from Chaplin's stage work from a play called Mumming Birds (a.k.a. A Night at an English Music Hall in the United States) with the Karno Company from London. Chaplin performed this play during his U.S. tours with Fred Karno company and decided to bring some of this play to his film work. Edna Purviance played a minor role as a lady in the audience.

Plot
Mr. Pest tries several theatre seats before winding up in front in a fight with the conductor and, eventually, the entire cast of an evening variety show.

The film concludes when a fire eater takes  the stage and Chaplin "heroically" drenches the performer and the audience with a fire hose.

The difference between "Mr. Pest" and "Mr. Rowdy" appears to be that one is pleasantly drunk and the other is obnoxious and sober.

Cast
 Charles Chaplin - Mr. Pest and Mr. Rowdy
 Edna Purviance - Lady in the Stalls with Beads
 Charlotte Mineau - Lady in the Stalls
 Dee Lampton - Fat Boy
 Leo White - Frenchman/Negro in Balcony
 Wesley Ruggles - Second Man in Balcony Front Row
 John Rand - Orchestra Conductor
 James T. Kelley - Trombone Player and Singer
 Paddy McGuire - Feather Duster/Clarinet Player
 May White - Fat Lady and Dancer
 Phyllis Allen - Lady in Audience
 Fred Goodwins - Gentleman in Audience
 Charles Inslee - Tuba Player

External links

 
 

1915 films
Short films directed by Charlie Chaplin
American silent short films
American black-and-white films
1915 comedy films
Silent American comedy films
Essanay Studios films
1915 short films
Articles containing video clips
American comedy short films
1910s American films